In supersymmetry, a theory of particle physics, projective superspace is one way of dealing with  supersymmetric theories, i.e. with 8 real SUSY generators, in a manifestly covariant manner.

See also
 Superspace
 Harmonic superspace

References

 

Supersymmetry